This is a list of legislation with popular names (of people), often the member of Parliament/Congress responsible for it or a law named for a person of notoriety that prompted enactment of the legislation. Some of these Acts acquired their names because short titles were not used, and some now have different short titles. Popular names are generally informal (such as Megan's law) but may reflect the official short title of the legislation.

Roman law

Lex Canuleia
Lex Trebonia
Lex Voconia

Brazil 

 Afonso Arinos Law 
 Aldir Blanc Law
 Carolina Dieckmann Law
 Eusébio de Queirós Law
 Falcão Law
 Feijó Law
 Kandir Law
 Maria da Penha Law
 Mariana Ferrer Law
 Pelé Law
 Rouanet Law
 Ruth Brilhante Law
 Saraiva Law

Canada

Jordan's Principle

United Kingdom and predecessor states

Bovill's Act (the Partnership Amendment Act 1865)
Clare's Law
The Coventry Act
Crewe's Act
Deasy's Act
Denman's Act
Fox's Act
Jervis' Act
Lord Birkenhead's Acts
Lord Brougham's Act
Lord Cairns' Act
Lord Campbell's Act:
The Libel Act 1843 (6 & 7 Vict. c.96)
The Fatal Accidents Act 1846 (9 & 10 Vict. c.93)
The Obscene Publications Act 1857
Lord Cranworth's Act (23 & 24 Vict c 145) (1860)
Lord Ellenborough's Act
Lord Hardwicke's Act
Lord Kingsdown's Act (the Wills Act 1861)
Lord Tenterden's Act
Malin's Act (the Married Women's Reversionary Interests Act 1857 (20 & 21 Vict c 57))
Palmer's Act
Peel's Acts
Poynings' Law (disambiguation)
Preston's Act (55 Geo 3 c 192) (1815)
Sarah's Law (officially the Child Sex Offender Disclosure Scheme)
Sophia Naturalization Act 1705
Strode's Act
The Thellusson Act

United States

The Adam Walsh Child Protection and Safety Act
Amy, Vicky, and Andy Child Pornography Victim Assistance Act of 2018
Andre's Law
The Bland–Allison Act
The Brady Handgun Violence Prevention Act
Brett's Law
Caylee's Law
The Comstock Law
The Copyright Term Extension Act, sometimes called the Sonny Bono Act
The Coogan Act
Emily's Law
The Hatch Act of 1939
Jarod's Law
Jennifer's Law (disambiguation)
Jessica's Law
Jonathan's Law
Kendra's Law
Lavinia Masters Act
Leandra's Law
The Mann Act
The Matthew Shepard Act
Megan's Law
Muhammad Ali Boxing Reform Act
The Music Modernization Act, sometimes called the Orrin G. Hatch–Bob Goodlatte Music Modernization Act
The Nelson Act
Pamela's Law
Reagan Tokes Act
The Ryan White CARE Act
Sami’s Law
The Sherman Antitrust Act
The Volstead Act
The Zacky Bill
The Wetterling Act
The Pure Food and Drug Act, sometimes called the Wiley Act or Dr. Wiley's Law

See also
List of short titles
List of legislation named for a place

References

Named
Lists of eponyms